Gwen van Poorten (born November 17, 1989) is a Dutch presenter, working for the Dutch public broadcasting association BNN.

Career 
Van Poorten started her career in 2012 as VJ for Dutch television network Xite.
As of 2014, she has stopped working for Xite and became a presenter for the Dutch television programs De Social Club and Spuiten en Slikken.
She also appears on the 3FM radio station as a sidekick in Barend en Wijnand and sometimes copresents Dumpertreeten on the Dutch video and photo sharing site Dumpert .

References 

Dutch television presenters
Dutch women television presenters
1989 births
Living people
People from Veghel
21st-century Dutch women